van Duren is a surname. Notable people with the surname include:

André van Duren (born 1958), Dutch film director
Hendrik Jan van Duren (1937–2008), Dutch politician
Mart van Duren (born 1964), Dutch footballer
Peter Bander van Duren (1930–2004), British heraldry expert

Surnames of Dutch origin